One is the debut studio album by Swiss singer Edita Abdieski. It was released through Sony Music on March 18, 2011 in German-speaking Europe, following her winning of the first season of the German version of the television music competition X Factor. Marek Pompetzki, Paul NZA, and Cecil Remmler produced most of the album, with Jörgen Elofsson and Robert Habolin also contributing. The album earned largely mixed reviews and reached the top ten of the Swiss Albums Chart. It was preceded by lead single "I've Come to Life" which became a top ten hit in Austria and Germany. One also includes second single "The Key" as well as "The Best Thing About Me Is You," a collaboration with Puerto Rican singer Ricky Martin.

Critical reception

In his review for laut.de, Ulf Kubankel praised Abdieski's vocal performance on One, but criticized the overall production. He wrote that "one can only hope that [Abdieski] will be able to show on her second album of what she's really made of."

Track listing

Charts

Release history

References

2011 albums